Trickster is a Canadian coming-of-age supernatural thriller drama television series, which premiered on CBC Television on October 7, 2020. The series is created by Tony Elliott and Michelle Latimer with Latimer also directing, and is adapted from Eden Robinson's 2017 novel Son of a Trickster.

The series was renewed for a second season prior to the first season's premiere; however, these plans were eventually cancelled on January 29, 2021, due to controversy around Michelle Latimer's Indigenous heritage.

Premise
The series centres on Jared, an Indigenous Haisla teenager and small-time drug dealer in Kitimat, British Columbia, who becomes increasingly aware of the magical events that seem to follow him.

Cast

Main
Joel Oulette as Jared
Crystle Lightning as Maggie, Jared's mother
Kalani Queypo as Wade
Nathan Alexis as Crashpad, Jared's best friend
Anna Lambe as Sarah
Georgina Lightning as Sophia, Jared's grandmother

Supporting
Craig Lauzon as Phil Nelson, Jared's father
Joel Thomas Hynes as Richie, Maggie's boyfriend
Mark Camacho as Tony
Gail Maurice as Georgina
Jamie Spilchuk as Mr. Good, a school guidance counselor
William C. Cole as Mr. Jacks

Episodes

Production
Despite being set in British Columbia, the majority of the show was filmed in and around North Bay, Ontario, although some outdoor establishing shots were filmed in Kitimat.

In advance of the television premiere, two episodes of the series were screened in the Primetime program at the 2020 Toronto International Film Festival, and at the Cinéfest Sudbury International Film Festival in Sudbury.

The first season was directed and co-written by Michelle Latimer. Following the emergence of questions about the legitimacy of her indigenous status, producers Tony Elliott and Danis Goulet resigned in protest on December 18, 2020, and Latimer resigned from the series three days later. The network did not immediately announce any decision on whether to replace her or simply cancel production of the followup seasons; the show's cancellation was announced in January 2021.

Writer Drew Hayden Taylor criticized the network's decision to cancel the series, writing that "if the chief executive officer of a company does something questionable, you fire the CEO, you don’t dissolve the company." He pointed out that a significant number of indigenous filmmakers are working in the contemporary Canadian film industry, who could easily have been hired to continue the show under new leadership: "The Indigenous film community is thriving, eager and capable of maintaining, maybe even improving, the framework that is already there and continue it forward. Just get a new showrunner. Showrunners come and go all the time in the television industry. I know three that are baristas."

International broadcast
In Australia, SBSOnDemand acquired the broadcast rights for the series, where it premiered on October 27, 2020.

In the UK, Syfy acquired the broadcast rights for the series, where it premiered on November 23, 2020.

In the US, The CW acquired the broadcast rights for the series, where it premiered on January 12, 2021.

In Brazil, Globoplay acquired the broadcast rights for the series, where it premiered on March 5, 2021.

Response
In its December 2020 year in review, the Canadian film and television industry magazine Playback named Trickster the Scripted Series of the Year.

Writing for The Globe and Mail, Drew Hayden Taylor positioned the series as a leading voice in the contemporary emergence of indigenous speculative fiction, alongside authors such as Cherie Dimaline, Waubgeshig Rice and Yvette Nolan. He linked the genre to indigenous storytelling traditions, which are often based on stories of the fantastical and mystical, and concluded that "Earlier, I mentioned that it was a genre we were interested in exploring. I may have been wrong. I think it’s a genre our Elders were familiar with. We’re just rediscovering it and putting new moccasins on it."

Awards

References

External links
 
 
 

2020s Canadian drama television series
Canadian supernatural television series
Canadian thriller television series
2020 Canadian television series debuts
2020 Canadian television series endings
CBC Television original programming
First Nations television series
Television shows set in British Columbia
Television shows based on Canadian novels
Coming-of-age television shows
Television series about teenagers
Television shows filmed in North Bay, Ontario